Crater of Diamonds State Park is a  Arkansas state park in Pike County, Arkansas, in the United States. The park features a 37.5-acre (15.2 ha) plowed field, the world's only diamond-bearing site accessible to the public. Diamonds have continuously been discovered in the field since 1906, including the graded-perfect Strawn-Wagner Diamond, found in 1990, and the Uncle Sam, found in 1924, which at over 40 carats is the largest diamond ever found in the United States. 

The site became a state park in 1972 after the Arkansas Department of Parks and Tourism purchased the site from the Arkansas Diamond Company and Ozark Diamond Mines Corporation, who had previously operated the site as a tourist attraction.

History

In August 1906, John Huddleston found two strange crystals on the surface of his  farm near Murfreesboro, Arkansas.

After 1906, several attempts at commercial diamond mining failed.  The only significant yields came from the original surface layer, where erosion over a long period of time had concentrated diamonds.  In the early period, 1907–1932, yields from this "black gumbo" surface material often exceeded thirty carats per hundred loads (50 mg/Mg) (standard 1600-pound tramload of the early period).  Highest yields from the undisturbed subsurface material (described as kimberlite or volcanic breccia by the U.S. Geological Survey) were two carats per hundred loads (3.5 mg/Mg) in 1908 and about two carats per hundred short tons (4.4 mg/Mg) in 1943−1944.

Because equipment of the early period usually included bottom screens with mesh larger than 1/16 inch (1.6 mm), thousands of smaller diamonds were allowed to pass through. In recent decades, those small diamonds have been fruitful for recreational diamond diggers.

Soon after the first diamond was found, a "diamond rush" created a boomtown atmosphere around Murfreesboro.  According to old tales, hotels in Murfreesboro turned away 10,000 people in the space of a year.  Supposedly, these aspiring diamond miners formed a tent city near the mine, which was named "Kimberly" in honor of the famous Kimberley diamond district in South Africa.  On the other hand, all available evidence indicates that the Town of Kimberly originated as a land-development venture in 1909, initiated by Mallard M. Mauney and his oldest son, Walter, on their land immediately south of Murfreesboro.  The project failed soon afterward as the speculative boom generated by the diamond discovery collapsed.  Today, the Kimberly area is almost all cow pasture, owned by Mauney's descendants.

During WWII the U.S. government took control of the mine and granted a contract to Glen Martin to extract this rare war materiel. Although diamonds were obtained, and the concentration of diamonds similar to other producing mines, this was not fully successful as a venture due to the large costs involved with U.S. labor. After the war, the property was returned to the previous owners. From 1951 to 1972, the crater hosted several private tourist attractions. The first, The Diamond Preserve of the United States, lasted about one year. In late 1951, Howard A. Millar stepped in and salvaged the infant tourist industry. In April 1952, Millar and his wife, Modean, launched the Crater of Diamonds attraction. Howard Millar, an accomplished writer and promoter, stirred unprecedented national publicity and drew enough visitors to sustain the operation. In March 1956, a visitor found the Star of Arkansas on the cleared surface. Later, Roscoe Johnston opened a rival tourist attraction, the Arkansas Diamond Mine, on the main part of the diamond field.

The rivalry between the two tourist operations left both in a weakened position. In 1970, the entire volcanic formation was consolidated by a private partnership, which then reassigned the property to General Earth Minerals (GEM) of Dallas, Texas. GEM expected to turn the property over for a profit, but ended up heavily indebted to GF Industries (GFI) of Dallas. Upon default, GFI took the property in July 1971.

GEM consolidated the tourist operation as well as the property. The tourist operation continued as the centerpiece of Crater of Diamonds State Park.

Due in part to the park, and also because Arkansas was the first place outside South Africa where diamonds were found at their original volcanic source, this special gem has come to be associated with the Natural State.  A large diamond symbol has dominated the state flag since 1912.  The Arkansas State Quarter, released in 2003, bears a diamond on its face, as do the current license plates.

Geology

The Crater of Diamonds volcanic pipe is part of a 95-million-year-old eroded volcano. The deeply sourced lamproite magma, from the upper mantle, brought the diamonds to the surface. The diamonds had crystallized in the cratonic root of the continent long before and were sampled by the magma as it rose to the surface.

The geology of the area and the diamond formation process itself were the subjects of the Ph.D. dissertation of Roland Everett Langford in 1973 of the University of Georgia. In it, he proposed a gas phase reaction from the reduction of carbon monoxide and carbon dioxide in the upper mantle.  The dissertation was on display at the state park for many years.

More recent research by geologist Dennis Dunn (Ph.D. dissertation 2002) established that the diamondiferous epiclastic rocks range from olivine lamproite to phlogopite and olivine-rich tuffs. Mantle xenolith chemistry were used to derive maximum pressures of ~5 GPa and temperatures of 1000 °C for the upper mantle origin of the lamproitic magma.

The lamproite diamond source is unusual, as almost all diamonds are mined from kimberlite and from alluvial deposits of diamonds weathered from kimberlite. The most prominent lamproite diamond source is the Argyle diamond mine in Australia.

Recreation

Crater of Diamonds State Park is known for the  plowed field on which visitors can hunt for diamonds and other semi-precious gems. On average, two diamonds are found per day by park visitors. A visitor center contains information about the geology of the park, a gift shop, and a cafe. Interested visitors can continue to the Diamond Discovery Center, which offers an interpretive look at prospecting for diamonds. The Diamond Springs aquatic playground, enclosed pavilion, trails, and picnic areas surround the diamond field. The park offers campers 47 Class AAA facilities near the Little Missouri River.

Diamond mine
Crater of Diamonds State Park is situated over an eroded lamproite volcanic pipe. The park is open to the public and, for a small fee, rockhounds and visitors can dig for diamonds and other gemstones.  Park visitors find more than 600 diamonds each year of all colors and grades.  As of 2015 over 75,000 diamonds had been found in the crater. Visitors may keep any gemstone they find regardless of its value.

In addition to diamonds, visitors may find semi-precious gems such as amethyst, agate, and jasper or approximately 40 other minerals such as garnet, phlogopite, quartz, baryte, and calcite.

Notable diamonds found

See also
 Kelsey Lake Diamond Mine, now-defunct similar commercial operation in Colorado
 National Register of Historic Places listings in Pike County, Arkansas
 List of diamonds

References

State parks of Arkansas
Diamond mines in the United States
Natural history of Arkansas
Parks on the National Register of Historic Places in Arkansas
Diatremes of the United States
Volcanoes of Arkansas
Cretaceous volcanoes
Geology museums in Arkansas
Museums in Pike County, Arkansas
Protected areas established in 1972
Protected areas of Pike County, Arkansas
Landforms of Pike County, Arkansas
National Register of Historic Places in Pike County, Arkansas
Mining in Arkansas